Miloš Živković (Serbian Cyrillic: Милош Живковић; born 1 December 1984) is a professional association football player.

Career
Živković went through all selections Radnički Niš and patiently waited for the opportunity to play in the first team. In 2004, Miloš was loaned to Železničar for two years, then played for Belarusian club Gomel before moving to Sinđelić Niš, Novi Pazar, Jagodina, Metalac and Rabotnički. After all of that, he returned to his home club.

In summer 2017, Živković signed with OFK Bačka.

References

External links
 
 
 Miloš Živković stats at utakmica.rs

1984 births
Living people
Sportspeople from Niš
Association football defenders
Serbian footballers
Serbian expatriate footballers
Expatriate footballers in Belarus
Expatriate footballers in North Macedonia
Expatriate footballers in Romania
Expatriate footballers in Iceland
Serbian expatriate sportspeople in Belarus
Serbian expatriate sportspeople in Romania
Serbian expatriate sportspeople in Iceland
Serbian SuperLiga players
Liga I players
Úrvalsdeild karla (football) players
FK Radnički Niš players
FC Gomel players
FK Sinđelić Niš players
FK Novi Pazar players
FK Jagodina players
FK Metalac Gornji Milanovac players
FK Rabotnički players
FC Botoșani players
Knattspyrnufélagið Víkingur players
OFK Bačka players
OFK Bečej 1918 players